The 2009-10 season is the 120th season of competitive football in Denmark.

Domestic competitions

Transfer deals

National team

Players

2010 World Cup squad

On May 10, a preliminary 30-man squad was named for the 2010 FIFA World Cup. The squad was cut down to 23 players on May 28.

|-----
! colspan="9" bgcolor="#B0D3FB" align="left" |

|-----
! colspan="9" bgcolor="#B0D3FB" align="left" |

|-----
! colspan="9" bgcolor="#B0D3FB" align="left" |

Other call-ups
In addition to the above, the following players have appeared for Denmark during the 2009-10 season:

|-----
! colspan="9" bgcolor="#B0D3FB" align="left" |

|-----
! colspan="9" bgcolor="#B0D3FB" align="left" |

Goal scorers

Record

Schedule

League XI national team

On December 1, 2009, a 20-man squad Denmark League XI national football team was named to play a number of unofficial national team games at the 2010 King's Cup. Before the tournament, several players had pull out. Goalkeeper Stephan Andersen due to injury, Jesper Grønkjær and William Kvist due to F.C. Copenhagen's advancement in the UEFA Europa League, and Michael Lumb due to his transfer move to a foreign club.

The number of caps and goals reflect performances during the 2010 King's Cup.

Players

|-----
! colspan="9" bgcolor="#B0D3FB" align="left" |

|-----
! colspan="9" bgcolor="#B0D3FB" align="left" |

|-----
! colspan="9" bgcolor="#B0D3FB" align="left" |

Schedule

References

External links
 Denmark: Fixtures and Results

 
Danish
Seasons in Danish football